Guide is a Portuguese village at Torre de Dona Chama, district of Bragança.

Guide has the grandeur of an ancient parish field, the main square and houses are showing nice care of old buildings, along with the modern.

Villages in Portugal
Populated places in Bragança District